Margaret Frame (1903 – 1985) was a Canadian painter known for her portraiture.

Biography
Margaret Frame was born in 1903 in Oxford, Nova Scotia. In 1906 her family moved to Regina, Saskatchewan and there she studied with Inglis Sheldon-Williams and James Henderson. 

Continuing her education, from 1922 to 1924 Frame was in Boston where she studied at the Museum of Fine Arts. There she was encouraged by John Singer Sargent and Philip Leslie Hale. Frame then studied at the Ecole des Beaux-Arts in Paris for four years.

In 1922 Frame's was included in the 44th exhibition of the Royal Canadian Academy of Arts in Montreal. In 1925 she exhibited two portraits at the British Empire Exhibition in London. In 1926 Frame had her first solo exhibition at the Galérie de Marsan in Paris. In 1932 her portraits were included at the Salon of Women Painters and Sculptors of France. 

In 1943 Frame married Squadron Leader Hazlitt Seymour Beatty, R.A.F.

She returned to Canada and opened a studio in Ottawa during World War II. 

Among Frame's subjects were George V, William Stevens Fielding, and Michael I of Romania. In 1954 she painted a portrait of  Margaret McCurdy  who served as the "first lady" of Nova Scotia from 1947 to 1952.

Frame died on December 18, 1985 in Napean, Ontario.

References

1903 births
1985 deaths
20th-century Canadian women artists
20th-century Canadian artists
Artists from Nova Scotia
20th-century Canadian painters
Canadian women painters
Canadian portrait artists